The following is a list of notable events and releases of the year 1958 in Norwegian music.

Events

May
 The 6th Bergen International Festival started in Bergen, Norway.

Deaths

 May
 28 – Ragnar Steen, guitarist and band leader (born 1904).

 January
 18 – Maja Flagstad, pianist, choral conductor, and répétiteur (born 1871).

 November
 4 – Johan Backer Lunde, songwriter, folk poet and revue writer (born 1874).
 20 – Arne Svendsen, songwriter, folk poet and revue writer (born 1884).

Births

 January
 27 – Tellef Øgrim, fretless guitarist, composer, and journalist.
 30 – Bjørn Klakegg, jazz guitarist and composer, Needlepoint.

 February
 5 – Lage Fosheim, singer, The Monroes, (died 2013).
 13 – Øivind Elgenes, vocalist, guitarist, and composer, Dance with a Stranger.

 March
 19 – Anne-Marie Giørtz, vocalist, orchestra conductor, singing teacher.

  April
 19 – Ragnar Bjerkreim, composer with film scores as his specialty.

 May
 12 – Ánde Somby, traditional Sami joik artist.
 13 – Henning Kvitnes, singer and songwriter.

 July
 18 – Gabriel Fliflet, vocalist, accordionist, and composer.

 August
 20 – Marius Müller, guitarist, vocalist, songwriter, and record producer (died 1999).
 25 – Bjarte Engeset, classical conductor.

 September
 3 – Lakki Patey, guitarist and inventor.

 October
 22 – Jan Gunnar Hoff, jazz pianist and composer.
 30 – Olav Dale, jazz saxophonist, composer, and orchestra leader (died 2014).

 December
 26 – Lynni Treekrem, singer and composer.

See also
 1958 in Norway
 Music of Norway

References

 
Norwegian music
Norwegian
Music
1950s in Norwegian music